Three is the third and final studio album by American country music group Gloriana. It was released on June 2, 2015 via Emblem Music Group/Warner Bros. Records. The album was produced by Matt Serletic. It includes the top 25 single "Trouble". This was Gloriana's final album before Rachel Reinert's departure from the band and before splitting with their label, Warner Bros. Nashville.

Track listing

Personnel

Gloriana
Mike Gossin - vocals
Tom Gossin - vocals
Rachel Reinert - vocals

Additional musicians
Alex Arias - programming
Tom Bukovac - electric guitar (except "It's On Tonight" and "Wanna Get to Know You")
Dan Dugmore - pedal steel guitar, lap steel guitar
Aubrey Haynie - fiddle, mandolin
Danny Myrick - piano on "It's On Tonight"
Tim Pierce - acoustic and electric guitars on "It's On Tonight"
Matt Serletic - keyboards, programming, percussion, bass guitar (on "It's On Tonight"), Hammond B-3 organ, banjo, Wurlitzer piano
Jimmie Lee Sloas - bass guitar (except "It's On Tonight")
Ilya Toshinsky - banjo, acoustic guitar, mandolin, washboard
Alexander Julius Wright - additional bass guitar on "It's On Tonight"

Additional vocalists
Alex Arias - on "Are You Ready"
Kevin Luu, F. Reid Shippen - on "Trouble"
Danny Myrick - on "It's On Tonight"
Patrick Woodward, Andy Martin, Ricky Kovac, Tony Solis, Tyler Jewell, Catt Gravitt, Steve Gossin, Rick Gossin - on "Fight"
Sfara Bake, Tony Solis, Bunny Knutson, Andy Martin, Davidicus Schacher - on "Let's Take a Shot"
Bunny Knutson - on "Lighters"

Strings on "Nobody but You"
Mocja Rukavina, Matjaz Porvone, Matjaz Zizek, Marija Simec, Jelena Sarc, Ajda Kralj, Barbara Fanedl, Beti Bratina - violins
Marjeta Skrjanc, Kristina Ramsak Spilar, Simona Skvarca - violas
Gordana Keller Petrej, Petra Gacnic Greblo - cellos
Mateja Murn Zorko - contrabass

Technical
Alex Arias - engineering
Tom Freitag - engineering
Rok Golob - conductor on "Nobody but You"
Ryan Hewitt - engineering
Ted Jensen - mastering
Chris Lord-Alge - mixing
Nigel Lundemo - engineering
Tomaz Maras - string engineer on "Nobody but You"
Matt Serletic - production; string arrangement on "Nobody but You"
F. Reid Shippen - engineering

Chart performance
The album debuted at No. 13 on the Top Country Albums chart, and Billboard 200 at 116, selling 4,500 for the week ending June 7, 2015.

Album

Singles

References

2015 albums
Gloriana (band) albums
Warner Records albums
Albums produced by Matt Serletic